The arrow flying squirrel (Hylopetes sagitta) is a species of flying squirrel. It is endemic to Java and Bangka, Indonesia. The population is unknown as it has only been collected from a few localities. It is nocturnal and arboreal and may be found in primary and secondary forest. It is threatened by forest loss due to logging and agriculture and there are no known conservation actions.

Phylogenetic evidence indicates that the grey-cheeked flying squirrel (H. lepidus), which was described in 1822, is conspecific with this species.

References

Thorington, R. W. Jr. and R. S. Hoffman. 2005. Family Sciuridae. pp. 754–818 in Mammal Species of the World a Taxonomic and Geographic Reference. D. E. Wilson and D. M. Reeder eds. Johns Hopkins University Press, Baltimore.

Hylopetes
Mammals of Indonesia
Endemic fauna of Indonesia
Mammals described in 1766
Taxonomy articles created by Polbot
Taxa named by Carl Linnaeus